Paracupes is a genus of beetles in the family Cupedidae, the reticulated beetles.

There are three extant species:
Paracupes ascius – Ecuador
Paracupes brasiliensis – Brazil
Paracupes mexicanus, Rodríguez-Mirón & López-Pérez, 2019 Chiapas, Mexico

References

Archostemata genera
Cupedidae